The  is a limited-stop shinkansen service operated between  and  in Japan since 12 March 2011, following the completion of the Kyushu Shinkansen. The name was formerly used for a limited express sleeping car service operated by JNR from 1961, which ran from Tokyo to Kumamoto, and was discontinued in December 1994. The name "" literally means "abundant rice" in Japanese and "harvest" in the figurative sense. It was also an ancient name of Japan.

As with the existing Nozomi service operating on the Tokaido & San'yō Shinkansen lines, the Mizuho service is not valid for foreigners traveling with a Japan Rail Pass.

Train formation
Mizuho services are operated by 8-car JR West N700-7000 series and JR Kyushu N700-8000 series trainsets, with car 1 at the Kagoshima-Chuo end. All seats are non-smoking.

History

Limited express sleeping car service

From 1 October the following year, the service was upgraded from a "seasonal" service to become a daily service.

The typical formation at this time was as shown below, with car 1 at the Kumamoto end.

The schedule was as shown below.

The typical formation at this time was as shown below, with car 1 at the Kumamoto end. Cars 1 to 7 ran between Tokyo and Kumamoto, while cars 8 to 13 ran between Tokyo and Oita.

From October 1964, the Mizuho service once again became a direct service between Tokyo and Kumamoto following the introduction of the Fuji service running between Tokyo and Oita.

The typical formation at this time was as shown below, with car 1 at the Kumamoto end. Cars 8 to 14 ran between Tokyo and Hakata only.

From March 1972, new 14 series sleeping cars were introduced on Mizuho services, replacing the 20 series cars.

From June 1991, dining car facilities were discontinued, and the Mizuho service itself was discontinued from 3 December 1994.

Shinkansen

The services are aimed primarily at the business market, with two return services in the morning and two in the evening. An additional daily return working was added from 17 March 2012, increasing the number of services from four to five.

By 15 March 2014, there were six daily return workings per direction, with two trains stopping at Himeji to boost connectivity in the Kansai region. As of 14 March 2020, there are eight daily return workings per direction, with some trains making additional stops at Sendai, Kurume, Shin-Yamaguchi, Fukuyama or Himeji.

See also
 List of named passenger trains of Japan
 Blue Train (Japan)

References

External links
 JR Kyushu news release (20 October 2010) 
 JR West news release (20 October 2010) 

Kyushu Railway Company
West Japan Railway Company
Night trains of Japan
Railway services introduced in 1961
Railway services introduced in 2011
Named Shinkansen trains